Okalewo  is a village in the administrative district of Gmina Skrwilno, within Rypin County, Kuyavian-Pomeranian Voivodeship, in north-central Poland.

The village has a population of 900.

History
In 1827, the village had a population of 341. A steam mill was built in 1869.

During the German occupation of Poland (World War II), local teachers were among Polish teachers from the county deceitfully gathered at a supposed formal meeting and then massacred in Rypin in November 1939 (see Intelligenzaktion). Furthermore, a Polish teacher from Sławianowo was murdered by the occupiers in the forest of Okalewo.

Notable people
Czesław Młot-Fijałkowski (1892–1944), brigadier general of the Polish Army

References

Okalewo